The Parable of the Friend at Night (also known as the Parable of the Friend at Midnight or of the Importunate Neighbour) is a parable of Jesus which appears in . In it, a friend eventually agrees to help his neighbor due to his persistent demands rather than because they are friends, despite the late hour and the inconvenience of it.

This parable demonstrates the need to pray without giving up. It is similar to the Parable of the Unjust Judge and is depicted by several artists, including William Holman Hunt.

Narrative 

The parable is as follows:

The scene described in this parable suggests a single-roomed peasant house, where the whole family sleeps together on a mat on the floor, and a man travelling by night to avoid the heat of the day. The reason for the friend's request is hospitality, a sacred duty throughout the Mediterranean world in antiquity.

Interpretation
This parable appears in the Gospel of Luke immediately after Jesus teaches the Lord's Prayer, and can therefore be viewed as a continuation of Jesus teaching his disciples how to pray, while the verses which follow help to explain the meaning of the parable:

Joel B. Green suggests that the question that opens the parable ("Which of you who has a friend...?" also expressible as "Can you imagine...?") is intended to be answered as an emphatic "No!", since no friend would refuse to help under such circumstances (the opening words in Greek occur elsewhere in Luke, but have no contemporary parallels, and I. Howard Marshall regards them as probably characteristic of Jesus himself). However, Jesus goes on to point out that even if friendship wasn't a big enough motivation, help would still be forthcoming. As with verses , the parable is therefore an incentive to pray. The parable of the Unjust Judge has a similar meaning.

John McEvilly comments on this parable, writing, "Our Lord illustrates by the following parable—which St. Luke alone records—or familiar comparison, founded on what might occur in daily life to any of themselves, the necessity of fervour and perseverance in prayer. All the circumstances are of a very pressing character—the hour of the night so inconvenient, the urgent necessity of the case, not even the simplest means of meeting the wants of the stranger, fatigued and hungry from his journey. Hence, the petition for “three loaves,” one for the host himself, one for the hungry, fatigued guest, and a third in case the two did not suffice. In the East the home-made cakes were small."

Cornelius a Lapide gives a similar interpretation, writing, "God wills that we should continue instant in prayer, and is pleased with our “importunity,” for persistent prayer is “violence pleasing to God.” Tertullian."

Depictions

There are a number of depictions of this parable, the most famous being The Importunate Neighbour (1895) by William Holman Hunt, held in the National Gallery of Victoria, Australia.

See also
 Life of Jesus in the New Testament
 Ministry of Jesus
 Parable of the Unjust Judge

References

Friend at Night, Parable of the
Gospel of Luke
Prayer